T-Force may refer to:

T-Force, a British Army force from the Second World War
T-Force, a 1994 sci-fi film
Mr. T and the T-Force, a comic book series